Bezirk Deutschlandsberg is a district of the state of Styria in Austria. Since the 2015 Styria municipal structural reform, it consists of the following municipalities:

 Deutschlandsberg
 Eibiswald
 Frauental an der Laßnitz
 Groß Sankt Florian
 Lannach
 Pölfing-Brunn
 Preding
 Sankt Josef
 Sankt Martin im Sulmtal
 Sankt Peter im Sulmtal
 Sankt Stefan ob Stainz
 Schwanberg
 Stainz
 Wettmannstätten
 Wies

Municipalities before 2015
Towns (Städte) are indicated in boldface; market towns (Marktgemeinden) in italics; suburbs, hamlets and other subdivisions of a municipality are indicated in small characters.
 Aibl
Aichberg, Hadernigg, Rothwein, Sankt Bartlmä, Sankt Lorenzen, Staritsch
 Bad Gams
Bergegg, Feldbaum, Sallegg, Furth, Gersdorf, Greim, Hohenfeld, Mitteregg, Müllegg, Niedergams, Vochera am Weinberg
 Deutschlandsberg
 Eibiswald
 Frauental an der Laßnitz
Freidorf an der Laßnitz, Freidorfer Gleinz, Laßnitz, Schamberg, Zeierling
 Freiland bei Deutschlandsberg
 Garanas
Oberfresen
 Georgsberg
Ettendorf bei Stainz, Pichling bei Stainz, Rossegg
 Greisdorf
Sommereben, Steinreib, Wald in der Weststeiermark
 Gressenberg
 Groß Sankt Florian
Grünau an der Laßnitz, Gussendorf, Kraubath in der Weststeiermark, Krottendorf an der Laßnitz, Lebing, Petzelsdorf in der Weststeiermark, Tanzelsdorf, Vochera an der Laßnitz
 Großradl
Bachholz, Feisternitz, Kleinradl, Kornriegl, Oberlatein, Pongratzen, Stammeregg, Sterglegg, Wuggitz
 Gundersdorf
Grubberg
 Hollenegg
Aichegg, Hohlbach, Kresbach, Neuberg, Rettenbach, Trag, Kruckenberg
 Kloster
Rettenbach, Klosterwinkel
 Lannach
Blumegg, Breitenbach in der Weststeiermark, Heuholz, Hötschdorf, Sajach, Teipl
 Limberg bei Wies
Limberg, Mitterlimberg
 Marhof
Angenofen, Rainbach, Sierling, Teufenbach, Trog, Wald in der Weststeiermark
 Osterwitz
 Pitschgau
Bischofegg, Haselbach, Hörmsdorf
 Pölfing-Brunn
Brunn, Jagernigg, Pölfing
 Preding
Klein-Preding, Tobis, Tobisberg, Wieselsdorf
 Rassach
Graschuh, Herbersdorf, Lasselsdorf
 Sankt Josef
Oisnitz, Tobisegg
 Sankt Martin im Sulmtal
Aigen, Bergla, Dörfla, Greith, Gutenacker, Oberhart, Otternitz, Reitererberg, Sulb
 Sankt Oswald ob Eibiswald
Krumbach, Mitterstraßen, Rothwein
 Sankt Peter im Sulmtal
Freidorf, Kerschbaum, Korbin, Moos, Poppenforst, Wieden
 Sankt Stefan ob Stainz
Lemsitz, Lichtenhof, Pirkhof, Zirknitz 
 Schwanberg
Mainsdorf
 Soboth
Laaken
 Stainz
Gamsgebirg, Kothvogel, Neurath
 Stainztal
Grafendorf bei Stainz, Graggerer, Mettersdorf, Neudorf bei Stainz, Wetzelsdorfberg, Wetzelsdorf in der Weststeiermark
 Stallhof
 Sulmeck-Greith
Dietmannsdorf im Sulmtal, Gasselsdorf, Graschach, Kopreinigg, Pitschgauegg, Tombach
 Trahütten
Kruckenberg, Rostock
 Unterbergla
Grub bei Groß Sankt Florian, Hasreith, Michlgleinz, Mönichgleinz, Nassau, Sulzhof
 Wernersdorf
Buchenberg, Kogl, Pörbach
 Wettmannstätten
Lassenberg, Schönaich, Weniggleinz, Wohlsdorf, Zehndorf
 Wielfresen
Unterfresen, Wiel 
 Wies
Altenmarkt, Aug, Buchegg, Etzendorf, Gaißeregg, Gieselegg, Lamberg, Vordersdorf

References

 
Districts of Styria